After Midnight may refer to:

Film
 After Midnight (1921 film), an American film directed by Ralph Ince
 After Midnight (1927 film), an American silent film starring Norma Shearer
 After Midnight (1938 film), a German film directed by	Carl Hoffmann
 After Midnight (1989 film), an American horror anthology film 
After Midnight (1990 film), a film starring Hayley Mills
 After Midnight (2004 film), an Italian romantic comedy film (Italian: Dopo mezzanotte)
 After Midnight (2014 film), an American mystery thriller film directed by Fred Olen Ray
 After Midnight (2019 film), an American romantic monster movie directed by Jeremy Gardner and Christian Stella

Games
 After Midnight (adventure), for the role-playing game Marvel Super Heroes

Literature
After Midnight (Keun novel), 1937 book by Irmgard Keun (German: Nach Mitternacht)
After Midnight (Albrand novel), a 1948 novel by Martha Albrand

Music
 After Midnight (musical), a 2013 Broadway musical

Albums
 After Midnight (Nat King Cole album), 1957
 After Midnight (The Manhattans album), 1980
 After Midnight (The Seldom Scene album), 1981
 After Midnight (Janie Fricke album), 1987
 After Midnight: Kean College, 2/28/80, a 2004 album by the Jerry Garcia Band

Songs
 "After Midnight" (Blink-182 song), 2011
 "After Midnight" (J. J. Cale song), 1966, also covered by Eric Clapton

See also 
 After Midnight Project, an American rock band
 After Midnight with Boston Blackie, 1943 film
"Walkin' After Midnight," 1957 song